Kennedia carinata is a species of flowering plant in the family Fabaceae and is endemic to the south-west of Western Australia. It is a prostrate shrub with trifoliate leaves and reddish-purple, pea-like flowers.

Description

Taxonomy and naming
This species was first formally described in 1837 by George Bentham who gave it the name Physolobium carinatum in Enumeratio plantarum quas in Novae Hollandiae ora austro-occidentali ad fluvium Cygnorum et in sinu Regis Georgii collegit Carolus Liber Baro de Hügel from specimens collected by Charles von Hügel near King George's Sound. In 1855 Louis Benoit Van Houtte changed the nae to Kennedia carinata. The specific epithet (carinata) means "keeled", referring to the petal keel.

Distribution and habitat
This kennedia grows on swampy river flats and the lower slopes of hills in the Esperance Plains, Jarrah Forest, Swan Coastal Plain and  Warren biogeographic regions of south-western Western Australia.

Conservation status
Kennedia carinata is classified as "not threatened" by the Government of Western Australia Department of Biodiversity, Conservation and Attractions.

References

carinata
Mirbelioids
Flora of Western Australia
Plants described in 1837
Taxa named by George Bentham